This is a List of World Championships medalists in sailing in centreboard classes.

29er

420

Open

Men and Mixed

Women

Open Youth

470

Open

Male and Mixed

Male

Female

Youth Male

Youth Female

49er Open

49er Men's

49er Youth

49er FX Women's

49er FX Youth

505

B14

Cadet

Contender

Enterprise

Europe

Open

Men

Women

Finn

Fireball

Flying Dutchman

International 14

Fleet racing

Team racing

Laser 2

Laser

Laser Radial

Men

Women

Lightning

Mirror

Moth

Musto Skiff

OK

O'pen BIC

Optimist

RS100

RS500

RS Aero

RS Feva

RS Tera

Snipe

Splash

Sunfish

Tasar

Topper

Vaurien

Zoom 8

See also
ISAF Sailing World Championships
World Sailing

References

External links
Sailing competitions

Centreboaard